The 1928–29 Sussex County Football League season was the ninth in the history of the competition.

League table
The league featured 12 clubs, 11 which competed in the last season, along with one new club:
 Littlehampton

League table

References

1928-29
9